This is a list of the 46 railway stations in Delhi, India, including 21 on the Delhi Ring Railway.

Categories
There are four A-1 category railway stations in Delhi, out of total 75 in India.

There are four A category railway stations in Delhi, out of total 332 in the country.

There are 38 minor railway stations in Delhi.

There are 21 stations on the  Delhi Ring Railway that parallels the Delhi Ring Road.

Delhi Ring Railway

The Delhi Ring Railway stations are listed in a clockwise direction, starting from Hazrat Nizamuddin:

See also
 Northern Railway Zone
 Delhi railway division
 Delhi Suburban Railway

References

Delhi

Railway stations